Jordan Jones may refer to:

Jordan Jones (Australian footballer) (born 1990), Australian rules football player
Jordan Jones (footballer, born 1994), English-born Northern Ireland international football player
Jordan Jones (soccer) (born 1995), American professional soccer player
Jordan Jones (Emmerdale), fictional character on Emmerdale